Schefflera fastigiata is a species of plant in the family Araliaceae. It is endemic to Java in Indonesia. It is an endangered species threatened by habitat loss.

References

fastigiata
Endemic flora of Java
Endangered plants
Taxonomy articles created by Polbot